Feihe may refer to these places in Anhui, China:

Feihe, Bozhou
Feihe, Hefei
Feihe Township, Huaiyuan County

See also
Fei River (disambiguation)